Argentine films premiered in 2018.

January
 El club de los malditos
 El último traje
 La obra secreta
 Las grietas de Jara
 Los olvidados
 No dormirás
 Pendular

February
 Recreo

April
 La Flor (at Buenos Aires International Festival of Independent Cinema)

Other 
 The Accused
 El Angel
 Terrified
 Marilyn
 My Best Friend
 The Snatch Thief
 A Twelve-Year Night
 You Shall Not Sleep
 Pensando en él
 Perdida
 El Potro: Unstoppable
 La quietud
 The Queen of Fear
 The Last Man

External links
2018 in Argentina

2018
Argentina